The Carl's Addition Historic District is a predominantly residential historic district in Siloam Springs, Arkansas.  The area was developed between about 1895 and 1945, a period of growth brought about by the arrival of the railroad.  It contains a concentration of Queen Anne and Craftsman style houses, although other popular revival styles are also represented to some degree.  The district extends along South Wright Street between Twin Springs and Alpine Streets, and for single blocks along West Alpine and South College Streets.

The district was listed on the National Register of Historic Places in 1997.

See also
National Register of Historic Places listings in Benton County, Arkansas

References

Queen Anne architecture in Arkansas
Colonial Revival architecture in Arkansas
Historic districts in Benton County, Arkansas
Historic districts on the National Register of Historic Places in Arkansas
Siloam Springs, Arkansas
National Register of Historic Places in Benton County, Arkansas